The Merchant's House Museum, known formerly as the Old Merchant's House and as the Seabury Tredwell House, is the only nineteenth-century family home in New York City preserved intact—both inside and out.  Built "on speculation" in 1832 by Joseph Brewster, a hatter by trade, it is located at 29 East Fourth Street, between Lafayette Street and the Bowery in Manhattan.  It became a museum in 1936, founded by George Chapman, a cousin of the family who once lived there.

The House was among the first 20 buildings designated in 1965 under the City's new landmarks law. It is the only historic house museum in the Greenwich Village/Soho/NoHo neighborhoods.

History

Joseph Brewster, the builder, sold the house to Seabury Tredwell, a wealthy New York merchant, for $18,000. Tredwell's daughter, Gertrude, was born in the house in 1840.

Gertrude and her seven siblings, two brothers and five sisters, all lived in the house with their parents, four servants, and an ever-changing assortment of nieces, nephews, cousins, aunts, and other relatives. Only two daughters and one son ever married, which was unusual for that era and for an affluent family with social position.

Seabury died in 1865 and the remaining family lived at the home into old age. Gertrude, the youngest member of the immediate family, lived there alone for 24 years after the death of her sister Julia in 1909. As she grew older and more eccentric she became obsessed with holding on to the elegant home in a neighborhood that had become, by the early 20th century, a run-down, semi-industrial, and disreputable part of town. Burdened with severe financial hardship in her last years, she somehow managed to keep the beautiful home in nearly original condition, long after all the neighboring private homes had been demolished or converted into rooming houses, tenements, or commercial structures.

After her death in 1933, a distant cousin, George Chapman, purchased the building, saving it from foreclosure and demolition. In 1936, after needed repair and renovation, the house opened as a museum and has remained one since. The Merchant's House Museum remains a unique time capsule of the lives of a typical affluent New York merchant family of the 19th century, complete with the original possessions of the family.

Architecture and design
Its facade is reminiscent of earlier Federal-style homes, but the interior, especially the formal double parlors, represent New York's finest example of Greek revival architecture. The interior also contains the Tredwell family's original furnishings, including pieces from New York cabinetmaker Duncan Phyfe. The house contains a collection of original furnishings, decorative objects, magnificently preserved 19th century clothing, and other personal effects of the Tredwell family. The building underwent a major restoration in 1971 by architect Joseph Roberto and interior designer Carolyn Roberto.

Landmark designations
Due to its architectural and historic importance, the Merchant's House has been recognized with the following landmark designations:

 1936 – Documented by the Historic American Buildings Survey
 1965 – Designated by the Landmarks Preservation Commission as one of the first 20 New York City landmarks
 1965 – Designated as a National Historic Landmark  and part of the Historic House Trust in New York
 1966 – Listed on the National Register of Historic Places
 1981 – Designated as a New York City interior landmark

Several doors east of the museum at 37 East 4th Street is the Samuel Tredwell Skidmore House, a Greek Revival house built for a cousin of Seabury Tredwell. That building is also a New York City Landmark (designated 1970), but is in disrepair and in need of restoration.

Museum
In addition to its magnificent period rooms, the museum presents many performances, presentations, lectures, exhibits, and special events throughout the year. Ongoing research and state-of-the-art documentation and conservation techniques assure that more is constantly being learned about the house, its furnishings and outstanding textile collections, and "what life was really like" for a 19th-century New York family.

In 1991, in a joint effort with the Greenwich Village Society for Historic Preservation, the Merchant's House Museum launched the educational program, "Greenwich Village: History and Historic Preservation". The program was designed to teach students local history, architectural vocabulary, and the fundamentals of historic preservation. The program ran through the end of the 1990s at the museum, but eventually shifted its focus to the West Village, where it continues to reach out to students in the five boroughs.

Collection
The Museum's collection of over 3,000 items comprises the possessions of the Tredwells, the wealthy merchant-class family who lived in the House from 1835 to 1933. The collection includes furniture, decorative arts, clothing, photographs and books, household items, and personal items. Highlights include a suite of 12 mahogany side chairs attributed to renowned furniture maker Duncan Phyfe, a pair of matching six-globe gas chandeliers, and 40 dresses and numerous fashion accessories that belonged to the Tredwell women.

See also
 List of New York City Designated Landmarks in Manhattan below 14th Street
 National Historic Landmarks in New York City
 National Register of Historic Places listings in Manhattan below 14th Street

References

Citations

Sources

External links

Houses on the National Register of Historic Places in Manhattan
National Historic Landmarks in Manhattan
Historic American Buildings Survey in New York City
Houses completed in 1832
Federal architecture in New York (state)
New York City Designated Landmarks in Manhattan
New York City interior landmarks
Museums in Manhattan
Historic house museums in New York City
Houses in Manhattan
Museums established in 1936
Greenwich Village
1936 establishments in New York City
1832 establishments in New York (state)